Waterville Airport  is a public airport located one mile (2 km) northeast of the central business district of Waterville, a town in Douglas County, Washington, United States. It is owned by the Port of Douglas County.

Facilities and aircraft 
For the 12-month period ending December 31, 2005, the airport had 1,000 general aviation aircraft operations.

References

External links 
 Waterville Airport at Washington State DOT

Airports in Washington (state)